Subarnapur District, also called Sonepur District or Sonapur District, is an administrative district in Odisha state in eastern India. The town of Sonepur is the district headquarters. Sonepur has a rich cultural heritage  and is known as the Mandiramalini town (city of temples) of Odisha with more than hundred temples. The people of the Sonepur region are referred to as Sonepuria.

History
In the 8th century CE, the region was known as Swarnapur and was rules by vassal lords of the Bhaumkaras of Tosali. The region was then ruled by the Somavamsis and eventually became one of two capitals of the Somavamsis. Around the 10th and 11th centuries, the region was called Pashima Lanka or Western Lanka. The evidence for these names comes from a Somavamsi prince of the region called Kumara Someswaradeva who issued a copper plate charter in the late 10th century which identified him as the ruler of Paschima Lanka. Historically, the presiding deity of the region was the goddess Lankeswari. At some point during Somavamsi rule, the region was given its current name, Subarnapur. It was formally established as a district in 1993.

Economy
In 2006 the Ministry of Panchayati Raj named Subarnapur one of the country's 250 most backward districts (out of a total of 640). It is one of the 19 districts in Odisha currently receiving funds from the Backward Regions Grant Fund Programme (BRGF).

Divisions
 Sub-divisions: Sonepur and Birmaharajpur
 Tehsils: Sonepur, Binika, Rampur, Birmaharajpur, Tarbha, and Ullunda
 Blocks: Sonepur, Binika, Tarbha, Dunguripali, Birmaharajpur and Ullunda
 Municipality: Sonepur
 N.A.C.: Tarbha and Binika

Demographics
According to the 2011 census, Subarnapur district has a population of 610,183, roughly equal to the nation of Montenegro or the US state of Vermont. The district is the 512th most populous in India out of a total of 640. Its population growth rate over the decade of 2001–2011 was 20.35%. Subarnapur has a sex ratio of  959 females for every 1000 males, and a literacy rate of 74.42%. Scheduled Castes and Scheduled Tribes make up 25.60% and 9.37% of the population respectively. Hindus are the predominant religion, with 99.19% of the population.

At the time of the 2011 Census of India, 59.67% of the population in the district spoke Sambalpuri and 39.30% Odia as their first language.

Culture 
Subarnapur is home to a wide variety of cultural heritage, arts, and crafts. The Sonepur area specializes in textiles and terracotta, Tarbha and Binka produce brass metal works, Ullunda is home to a tradition of stone carving, and Dunguripali produces Paddy crafts.

Subarnapur is home to the poet and prophet Mahima Dharma. The district is also known for "Danda-nata", a religious folk tradition which is native to the area.

Temple town, Sonepur
 Paschima Lanka
 Lanka Podi
 Sasisena Kavya
 Sasisena Temple
 Sureswari Temple
 Subarnameru Temple
 Lankeswari Temple

Tourist attractions

 Mahima pitha, Khaliapali
 Gyaneswar Baba Shiv temple and museum at Kenjhiriapali village
 Metakani Temple, Ullunda
 Patali Srikhetra, Kotsamlai
 Rushyashrunga hill at Goudgad jungle
 Papakshya Ghat, Binka
 Kapileswar temple, Charda
 Nabagrahakunda
 Rameswar Shiva Temple
 Lord Sri Sri Swapneshwar Temple, Goudgad of BirmaharajPur Block.
 Thengo Irrigation Project of Birmaharajpur Block
 Maa Umadevi Temple and Siddheswar Temple
 Maa Ramachandi & Baba Raneswar Temple, Telanda
 Gupteswar Baba Temple, Gailmura
 Bhimtangar, Gailmura
Baunsa Bana, Dunguripali

Saree
 Sambalpuri Pata Saree
 Sonepuri Saree

Notable people
 Kailash Chandra Meher, painter awarded the Padma Shri.
 Nila Madhab Panda, film maker and director of I Am Kalam.
 Sabyasachi Mohapatra, Odia film director and producer.
 Jitamitra Prasad Singh Deo

Education in Subarnapur district

Schools 
Jawahar Navodaya Vidyalaya, Tarbha
 Sri Aurobindo Shikshyakendra, Goudgad
 Ganapati Adarsha Shikshya Niketan, Biramaharaj Pur
Swami Vivekananda Adarsha Vidyalaya, Khandahata
Anchalik Uchha Vidya Pitha, Kenjhiriapali
Centurion Public School, Dunguripali
Saraswati Shishu Mandir, Dunguripali
Saraswati Shishu Mandir, Rampur
Sahara Trust High School, Sonepur
Vishwabharti Chintan Shikshya Niketan, Sonepur

Colleges 
Sonepur College, Sonepur-Raj
Model Degree College, Subarnapur
Shree Ram College, Rampur
Maharaja High School, Sonepur
Dunguripali College, Dunguripali
Gram Panchayat College, Lachhipur
Buddhiram College, Menda
Birmaharajpur College Birmaharajpur

Politics
This district is a part of Balangir Lok Sabha constituency. The MP of Balangir is Sangeeta Kumari Singh Deo from the BJP.

Vidhan Sabha Constituencies

The following are the two Vidhan sabha constituencies of Subarnapur district and the elected members of each area.

Villages 
 

Baghahandi

See also 
 Kosalananda Kavya

References

External links
 
 Iconography of the Buddhist Sculpture of Orissa
 Cultural Profile of South Kosal
 Pasayat, C. (1994), "Myth and Reality in Little Tradition: A Study of Dandanata in Odisha" in Man in India, Vol.74, No.4, December 1994, pp. 413–427.
 Pasayat, C. (1998), Tribe, Caste and Folkculture, Jaipur/New Delhi: Rawat Publications.
 Pasayat, C. (2003), Glimpses of Tribal and Folkculture, New Delhi: Anmol Pub. Pvt. Ltd.

 
1993 establishments in Orissa
Districts of Odisha